The Ute Indian Museum is a local history museum in Montrose, Colorado, United States. It is administered by History Colorado (the Colorado Historical Society).

The museum presents the history of the Ute tribe of Native Americans. It was built in 1956 and expanded in 1998 and again in 2017. The museum building is located on the  homestead of Chief Ouray (c.1833–1880) and his wife, Chipeta (1843/4–1924). The grounds of the museum include the Chief Ouray Memorial Park, Chipeta's Crypt, and a native plants garden.

References

External links 
 Ute Indian Museum - History Colorado
 Ute Indian Museum Virtual Field Trip - Hewit Institute for History and Social Science Education 

Museums established in 1956
History museums in Colorado
Museums in Montrose County, Colorado
Protected areas of Montrose County, Colorado
Montrose, Colorado
Parks in Colorado
Gardens in Colorado
Ute tribe
History Colorado
Native American museums in Colorado
1956 establishments in Colorado